Covert Historic District is a national historic district located at Covert in Seneca County, New York.  The district includes 21 properties located in the hamlet of Covert.  The district is primarily residential and structures represent a variety of functions and styles spanning the period from 1810 to 1920.  The earliest structure was built as a tavern and it also includes the Town Hall, First Baptist Church (and cemetery), a modest schoolhouse, and Grange Meeting Hall.

It was listed on the National Register of Historic Places in 1980.

References

External links

Historic districts on the National Register of Historic Places in New York (state)
Historic districts in Seneca County, New York
National Register of Historic Places in Seneca County, New York